Benjamin Constant is a municipality located in the Brazilian state of Amazonas. Its population was 43,935 (2020) and its area is 8,793 km² (5,495 mi²).

The town is located by the confluence of the Javary River and the Amazon, close to the border with Peru.  However, there are no customs or immigration facilities in Benjamin Constant, and entry and exit formalities take place at Tabatinga on the opposite bank of the Amazon.  There are no roads into Benjamin Constant and the only access is by river boat. By fast boat it is about 31 hours from Manaus (about 7 days by slow boat).  The nearest airport is at Tabatinga, 2 hours by boat.

The area is inhabited by Ticuna Indians.  The Magüta Museum in the town is devoted to their culture and language.  In 1988 the town was the scene of the murder of 14 Ticunas in a dispute between them and logging interests.

The town was named after the Brazilian revolutionary Benjamin Constant (1836–1891).

Climate

References

Municipalities in Amazonas (Brazilian state)
Populated places on the Amazon